Yu-Gi-Oh! VRAINS is the sixth main anime series in the Yu-Gi-Oh! franchise. It is produced by Gallop and broadcast by TV Tokyo. The series is directed by Masahiro Hosoda. The series follows Yusaku Fujiki. It takes place in a high school environment in Den City. The series features Charisma Duelists who use VR and are similar to YouTubers. The show's theme is "Let's take one step forward and try it!" This season uses three pieces of theme music. From episodes 25–46, the second ending theme is "Writing Life" by Goodbye Holiday.

The English dub of the season aired on Teletoon in Canada from September 2018 to February 2019.


Episode list

References

VRAINS (season 1)
2017 Japanese television seasons
2018 Japanese television seasons